Sergei Andreyevich Petrov (born 2 January 1991) is a Russian football player. He plays as a right-back for FC Krasnodar.

Career
He made his debut for the main Zenit Saint Petersburg squad on 13 March 2011 in a Russian Premier League game against FC Terek Grozny.

On 11 December 2014, Petrov extended his Krasnodar contract until the end of the 2015–16 season.

International career
He was called up to the senior Russia squad in August 2016 for matches against Turkey and Ghana. He made his debut against Ghana on 6 September 2016. On 13 October  2019, he played his first competitive international game against Cyprus in the UEFA Euro 2020 qualifier, but was injured by Costas Laifis and left the field at the end of the first half.

On 19 November 2019, he scored his first national team goal in another qualifier against San Marino.

Career statistics

Club

International goals
Scores and results Russia's goal tally first.

References

External links
 Profile at the official FC Zenit St. Petersburg website

1991 births
People from Tosnensky District
Sportspeople from Leningrad Oblast
Living people
Russian footballers
Russia youth international footballers
Russia under-21 international footballers
Russia international footballers
Association football defenders
Association football midfielders
FC Zenit Saint Petersburg players
PFC Krylia Sovetov Samara players
FC Krasnodar players
Russian Premier League players